Valleyheart may refer to:

 Valleyheart (She Wants Revenge album), 2011
 Valleyheart (Justin Rutledge album), 2013
 North Valleyheart Riverwalk, a linear park in California